Edward Kupczyński (born 2 July 1929) is a former international speedway rider from Poland.

Speedway career 
Kupczyński was the champion of Poland, winning the Polish Individual Speedway Championship in 1952.

References 

Living people
1929 births
Polish speedway riders